"Move in the Right Direction" is a song by American indie rock band Gossip, released as the second single from their fifth studio album, A Joyful Noise (2012). The song found some success in Europe, reaching number two in Poland and number three in Austria and Hungary. The accompanying music video was directed by Price James.

Track listings
UK and Irish iTunes EP – Remixes
"Move in the Right Direction" – 3:31
"Move in the Right Direction" (CSS Remix) – 4:02
"Move in the Right Direction" (Seamus Haji Remix) – 6:40
"Move in the Right Direction" (Kaz James Remix) – 6:34
"Move in the Right Direction" (Classixx Remix) – 4:36

German iTunes EP – Remixes
"Move in the Right Direction" (Radio Edit) – 3:12
"Move in the Right Direction" (Seamus Haji Radio Edit) – 3:53
"Move in the Right Direction" (Classixx Remix) – 4:36
"Move in the Right Direction" (CSS Remix) – 4:02
"Move in the Right Direction" (Gossip vs. Kaz James Remix) – 6:34
"Move in the Right Direction" (music video) – 3:18

German CD single
"Move in the Right Direction" (Radio Edit) – 3:12
"Move in the Right Direction" (Album Version) – 3:31

Personnel
Credits adapted from A Joyful Noise album liner notes.

Gossip
 Gossip – additional production
 Beth Ditto – vocals
 Hannah Blilie – drums, percussion
 Nathan Howdeshell – guitar, keyboards, live bass, programming

Additional personnel

 Tom Coyne – mastering
 Fred Falke – additional programming, composition
 Luke Fitton – additional programming
 Matt Gray – additional programming, mixing
 Brian Higgins – additional programming, composition, mixing, producer
 Joshua Jenkin – additional programming
 Kieran Jones – additional programming, composition
 Sam Martin – additional programming
 Owen Parker – additional programming
 Jason Resch – additional composition, additional programming, composition
 Toby Scott – additional programming, composition, mixing, special production assistant
 Jeremy Sherrer – additional percussion, engineer
 Ben Taylor – assistant recording engineer

Charts

Weekly charts

Year-end charts

Release history

Certifications

References

2012 singles
Columbia Records singles
Gossip (band) songs
2012 songs
Songs written by Beth Ditto
Songs written by Brian Higgins (producer)
Songs written by Fred Falke